Egbert Hirschfelder (13 July 1942 – 31 May 2022) was a German rower. In 1963–1964 he won a European title and Olympic gold medal in the coxed four. He then changed to eight event and won another European title in 1967 and Olympic gold medal in 1968.

References

External links
 

1942 births
2022 deaths
Rowers from Berlin
Olympic rowers of West Germany
Olympic rowers of the United Team of Germany
Rowers at the 1964 Summer Olympics
Rowers at the 1968 Summer Olympics
Olympic gold medalists for West Germany
Olympic gold medalists for the United Team of Germany
Olympic medalists in rowing
West German male rowers
Medalists at the 1968 Summer Olympics
Medalists at the 1964 Summer Olympics
European Rowing Championships medalists